Lithium citrate (Li3C6H5O7) is a chemical compound of lithium and citric acid that is used as a mood stabilizer in psychiatric treatment of manic states and bipolar disorder. There is extensive pharmacology of lithium, the active component of this salt.

Lithia water contains various lithium salts, including the citrate.

History 
An early version of Coca-Cola available in pharmacies' soda fountains called Lithia Coke was a mixture of Coca-Cola syrup and lithia water. The soft drink 7Up was originally named "Bib-Label Lithiated Lemon-Lime Soda" when it was formulated in 1929 because it contained lithium citrate. The beverage was a patent medicine marketed as a cure for hangover. Lithium citrate was removed from 7Up in 1948 after it was banned  by the Food and Drug Administration.

Lithium Citrate is used as a mood stabilizer and is used to treat mania, hypomania, depression and bipolar disorder. It can be administered orally in the form of a syrup.

References

Citrates
Lithium salts
Mood stabilizers
Organolithium compounds